Celine Laforge (born ) is a Belgian female former volleyball player, playing as a setter. She was part of the Belgium women's national volleyball team.

She competed at the 2011 Women's European Volleyball Championship.

References

External links
http://www.cev.lu/competition-area/PlayerDetails.aspx?TeamID=8427&PlayerID=6932&ID=680
http://www.antennecentre.tv/www/volley_adieu_de_c_line_laforge_aux_dauphines_de_charleroi-84798-999-220.html

1985 births
Living people
Belgian women's volleyball players
Place of birth missing (living people)
Setters (volleyball)
21st-century Belgian women